Kevin John Freeman (October 21, 1941 – March 10, 2023) was an American equestrian who competed at three Olympic Games, winning silver medals in team eventing in 1964, 1968, and 1972.

Early life
Born in Portland, Oregon, Freeman grew up on a farm in nearby Molalla. After attending Cornell University, Freeman developed his equestrian skills in California. He competed in the 1963 Pan American Games, earning a gold medal in team competition, and a silver as an individual.

Olympics
In 1964, Freeman competed in eventing for the United States at the 1964 Summer Olympics in Tokyo aboard Gallopade, earning a silver medal in team competition and finishing 12th individually. Freeman competed again on the U.S. Team in the 1968 Summer Olympics in Mexico City riding Chalan. Freeman had ridden Chalan only one time before the Olympics and that was the day before the team shipped out for Mexico. In spite of a torrential rain storm on cross-country which obliterated some of the take-offs and landings, the team still won the silver medal.

After competition
Freeman was inducted into the Oregon Sports Hall of Fame in 1991, and in 2009, was inducted into the United States Eventing Association Hall of Fame along with Good Mixture, his horse at the 1972 Olympics. Freeman lived in the Garden Home neighborhood of Portland. He died on March 10, 2023, at the age of 81.

References

1941 births
2023 deaths
Sportspeople from Portland, Oregon
People from Molalla, Oregon
Cornell University alumni
American male equestrians
Olympic silver medalists for the United States in equestrian
Equestrians at the 1964 Summer Olympics
Equestrians at the 1968 Summer Olympics
Equestrians at the 1972 Summer Olympics
Sportspeople from the Portland metropolitan area
Medalists at the 1972 Summer Olympics
Medalists at the 1964 Summer Olympics
Pan American Games medalists in equestrian
Pan American Games gold medalists for the United States
Pan American Games silver medalists for the United States
Equestrians at the 1963 Pan American Games
Medalists at the 1963 Pan American Games